Georgia-May Davis (born 12 October 1995) is a British-born Australian actress.

Born in 1995 in London, England, Davis is the daughter of actress Alyssa-Jane Cook. She spent her early years growing up on the sets of her mothers shows. She attained a Bachelor of Media degree from Macquarie University.

During high school, Davis was cast in Network 10's revamp of the 1980s show "Young Talent Time".

Davis was offered the role on Disney Channel Australia as a presenter. As part of the role, Davis hosted multiple red carpet events for films and interviewed celebrities such as Cate Blanchett and Rihanna.

In 2021, Davis starred in the TV-series "Dive Club" which was first aired on Network 10 and later Netflix. The 12-part crime series is set in the fictional seaside town of Cape Mercy and focuses on a group of teenage ocean divers. Davis plays the role of Lauren Rose, the character whose disappearance after a cyclone becomes a mystery. The series was filmed on the Great Barrier Reef in Port Douglas, Queensland.

References 

Living people
1995 births
Australian child actresses
Australian television actresses